Heritage High School, established in 1996, is a public school in Newport News, Virginia. The school is home to the Heritage Hurricanes, and its colors are maroon and silver. The school is also home to the Newport News Public Schools Science, Technology, Engineering, and Mathematics (STEM) magnet program, as well as the University magnet program. The school is located in the South East End area of the city (Downtown) at 5800 Marshall Avenue. The current principal is Earling Hunter. The school has a twin school, Woodside High School, that was built simultaneously and designed by the same architects.

2021 shooting

On September 20, 2021, a shooting occurred at the school, injuring two people. The shooter, 15-year-old Jacari Taylor, was arrested and has since pleaded guilty to malicious wounding and four gun charges. Taylor, who showed remorse for his actions, was ultimately sentenced to 10 years for the shooting.

Demographics 

As of October 2009

Athletics 
In 2000, The Heritage football team won the Virginia state championship with a 14-0 overall record. In 2008, the girls basketball team also won the Virginia state title, defeating Forest Park.

Notable alumni
Darryl Blackstock NFL Player

References 

Educational institutions established in 1996
High schools in Newport News, Virginia
Public high schools in Virginia
Magnet schools in Virginia
1996 establishments in Virginia